is a 2011 Japanese film directed by Koji Kawano and based on the manga of the same name. It was debuted at the 3rd Okinawa International Movie Festival and was released in Japanese cinemas on 2 April 2011.

Cast
 Aoi Nakamura as Kotaro Tsutsumi
 Rio Yamashita as Nagisa Ichinose
 Satomi Tezuka as Kotaro's mom
 Rie Shibata as Nagisa's mom
 Michiko Hada
 Manami Azechi
 Matsunosuke Shofukutei
 K.G. as Masaki
 Kinuyo Kodama as Minako Kurita

Production
Over 800 people auditioned for a role in the film Hoshi no Furumachi, of which 46 made it to the final stage. The final audition was held at the Toyama Prefecture city hall on 31 January 2010. The list was narrowed down to 14 people, and the successful people were revealed on 2 February 2010.

Previously, on 30 January 2010, the governor of Toyama Prefecture declared his full support for the film Hoshi no Furumachi. In addition, he also announced the creation of a support committee for this film.

On 1 April 2010, it was announced that actress Rio Yamashita will be playing the role of Ichinose Nagisa, the main heroine in the manga. It was also announced that actor Aoi Nakamura will play the hero of the film. Other cast members announced that day includes Satomi Tezuka, Rie Shibata, K.G. and Kinuyo Kodama.

References

External links
 
 

Live-action films based on manga
2011 films
2010s Japanese films

ja:ほしのふるまち